John Jellicoe may refer to:

John Jellicoe, 1st Earl Jellicoe (1859–1935), Royal Naval Officer who commanded the fleet at the Battle of Jutland
John Jellicoe (illustrator) (1842–1914), illustrator for both magazines and books
John Jellico (1856–1925), British Olympic sailor